Oliver Plunkett Street is a shopping street in Cork, Ireland. It was originally laid-out in the early 18th century as the city expanded eastwards beyond the original city walls.

History
At the start of the 18th century, Oliver Plunkett Street was the first street built east of the Grand Parade in the area then known as the East Marsh or Dunscombe Marsh. It was originally named George's Street after George I, the then reigning King of Great Britain and Ireland. In 1920, during the Burning of Cork, large parts of the street were destroyed by British troops.

After the establishment of the Irish Free State, the street was renamed after Oliver Plunkett, a 17th-century martyr and Roman Catholic Archbishop of Armagh. The name change was gradual and as late as 1945, business directories still contained a reference to 'Late George's Street'. Cork's lowest-lying street, at 4 metres above sea level, the street is prone to periodic flooding when the River Lee bursts its banks.

Location and use
The street runs in a straight line from Custom House Street to Grand Parade. Other streets lead off from Oliver Plunkett Street in a grid pattern, such as Prince’s Street, Cook Street, and Smith Street. With 15 streets on both sides of Oliver Plunkett Street, there are a number of access points to the street from St. Patrick's Street to the north and the South Mall to the south.

Between Grand Parade and Parnell Place, the street is a shopping street. This section of the street is also home to Cork's General Post Office. A small lane, known as Market Lane, provides access to the English Market. There are over one hundred independent retailers on the street, many of which have been family-owned for several generations.

It is also one of a number of nightlife centres in Cork - although there are more bars and restaurants on the neighbouring side streets than on Oliver Plunkett Street itself.

Between Parnell Place and Custom House Quay, the east end of the street is known as Oliver Plunkett Street Lower.

Pedestrianisation
A number of the side streets between Oliver Plunkett Street and St. Patrick's Street are fully pedestrianized. Along with neighbouring streets, the section of Oliver Plunkett Street between Parnell Place and Grand Parade is pedestrianized between 10:30am and 4:30pm every day. Automatic bollards are installed at the junction with Parnell Place and also at the junctions of Princes St and South Mall, Pembroke St and Phoenix St and Maylor St and St. Patrick's Street, to create this pedestrianised area.

Awards
The street won the 'Great Street Award', awarded by London's Academy of Urbanism, in 2016.

References

Streets in Cork (city)
Shopping districts and streets in Ireland